Mobicip is a cloud-based Internet filter and parental control service that works on all major platforms of mobile Internet devices. Mobicip is supported on various types of devices used by families such as the iPhone, iPod Touch, iPad, Android, Windows, macOS and Chromebook. Mobicip was launched in 2008. Mobicip used to be a safe browser app but is now a VPN on iOS & Android that filters any browser. Mobicip is a parental control application that protects internet, regulates screentime, allows/blocks apps and tracks location as well, while allowing parents to customize the configuration and view activity reports. Using the web-based or mobile applications, parents can customize the filter to set up whitelists and blacklists, block categories of websites, and manage users and devices. In addition, the application lets parents monitor the Internet activity on the device, group the activity by user, by allowed or blocked websites, sort by time etc.

History
Mobicip (pronounced mo-be-sip) is named after mobile CIPA. CIPA stands for Children's Internet Protection Act, a regulation by the US government that mandates secure internet access when provided by public schools or libraries. In the days before smartphones and tablets, the founders had a vision that education would be transformed by ubiquitous always-on mobile technology in the hands of K-12 students. Mobicip was born with a mission to create and foster the safe use of technology for learning.

External links
Official website

References 

Content-control software